Julia Wagret (born 20 January 1999) is a French ice dancer. With her former skating partner, Pierre Souquet-Basiège, she is the 2020 Winter Star silver medalist. With her former skating partner, Mathieu Couyras, she is the 2017 French junior national bronze medalist and a silver medalist in the team event at the 2016 Winter Youth Olympics.

Personal life 
Wagret was born on 20 January 1999 in Valenciennes, France. She enjoys contemporary dance and drawing.

Career

Early career 
Wagret began competing with Mathieu Couyras in the 2011–12 season. They were coached by Muriel Zazoui and Olivier Schoenfelder in Lyon. Wagret/Couyras competed on the ISU Junior Grand Prix for four seasons before their split following the 2017–18 season.

2018–2019 season 
Wagret teamed up with Pierre Souquet-Basiège prior to the season. They placed in the top nine at three Challenger Series events, 2018 CS Lombardia Trophy, 2018 CS Inge Solar Memorial – Alpen Trophy, and 2018 CS Golden Spin of Zagreb. Wagret/Souquet-Basiège also competed at several Senior B competitions.

Wagret/Souquet-Basiège placed fourth at the 2019 French Championships. They concluded their season at the 2019 Winter Universiade, where they finished sixth.

2019–2020 season 
Wagret/Souquet-Basiège placed fifth at 2019 CS U.S. International Figure Skating Classic to open the season. They also placed fifth at 2019 CS Ice Star, earning personal bests in all three segments. Wagret/Souquet-Basiège were assigned to their first Grand Prix event, 2019 Internationaux de France, where they finished ninth.

2020–2021 season 
With the COVID-19 pandemic making international competition difficult, Wagret/Souquet-Basiège were initially assigned to compete at the 2020 Internationaux de France, but it was subsequently cancelled.

2021–2022 season 
Wagret/Souquet-Basiège debuted at the 2021 CS Lombardia Trophy, placing fourteenth.

Programs

With Souquet-Basiège

With Couyras

Competitive highlights 
GP: Grand Prix; CS: Challenger Series; JGP: Junior Grand Prix.

With Souquet-Basiège

With Couyras

References

External links 
 
 

1999 births
French female ice dancers
Living people
Figure skaters at the 2016 Winter Youth Olympics
Competitors at the 2019 Winter Universiade
21st-century French women